The Book Collector is a London based journal that deals with all aspects of the book.

It is published quarterly and exists in both paper and digital form. It prints independent opinions on subjects ranging from typography to national heritage policy, from medieval libraries to modern first editions. It has run series on Unfamiliar Libraries, Literary and Scientific Autographs, Author Societies, Bookbinding, Contemporary Collectors, Bibliophiles, and many other subjects.

History 
An earlier series that preceded the Book Collector was the Book Handbook.
The Book Collector was launched by the novelist Ian Fleming in the same year, 1952, that he wrote the first James Bond novel, Casino Royale. This has been discussed at the TLS.

The journal has had only four editors since it was founded. After the death in 1965 of John Davy Hayward, the friend and muse of T.S. Eliot, it was edited for fifty years by Nicolas Barker, sometime publisher and first head of conservation at the British Library. He gave a presentation on the history of The Book Collector at the Caxton Club in 1998. In 2015 he stepped down and James Fergusson, founding obituaries editor of The Independent, 1986-2007, took his place.
Essays about book collecting by Geoffrey Keynes in the Book Collector have been published in a compilation volume.

Highlights
Some articles of particular interest include "Our Literary Banquet," a fantasy banquet for bibliophiles with place settings (2021); "National Trust Libraries"(2005);"In Search of Missing Copies of Shakespeare's First Folio"(1994); “The Elmer Belt Library of Vinciana”(1989);"Russian Bookbinding from the 11th to the Middle of the 17th Century;"   and a series on the Biblotheca Thuana.

Publication 
The Book Collector publishes four times a year in March, June, September and December. Each issue consists of 192pp and is sent to subscribers by airmail, where appropriate. Subscribers also have digital access to every issue of The Book Collector, as printed, since its first appearance in 1952 and to its predecessor Book Handbook, which was published in twenty-eight numbers between 1947 and 1951. There is no restriction for libraries and other institutions on the number of digital users. The Book Collector'''s website holds its complete archive, indexed.

PodcastsThe Book Collector'' produces Podcasts at Soundcloud.   Episodes include: "Ian Fleming: A Personal Memoir" by P.H. Muir, read by Rupert Vansittart; "Portrait Of A Bibliophile XVI: John Ruskin 1819-1900" by James S. Dearden; and 'Scribes in Ice and Darkness' by Fergus Fleming.

Publication details

See also
 Book trade in the United Kingdom
 Books in the United Kingdom

References

External links
 

Book collecting
Business magazines published in the United Kingdom
Magazines published in London
Magazines established in 1952
Bookbinding